West Runton Cliffs is a  geological Site of Special Scientific Interest east of Sheringham in Norfolk. It is a Geological Conservation Review site.

This site is important because it exposes a succession of warm and cold stages in the middle Pleistocene between about 2 million and 400,000 years ago, including the notably fossiliferous Cromer Forest Bed. It shows a succession of advances and retreats of the sea, and it is the stratotype for the Cromerian Stage.

The beach is open to the public.

References

Sites of Special Scientific Interest in Norfolk
Geological Conservation Review sites